The Alabama State Fairgrounds, also known as Fair Park, was the former home of the Alabama State Fair (until 2001) and the Birmingham International Raceway (until 2009), and is located in West Birmingham, Jefferson County, Alabama, United States. It is located adjacent to the Five Points West shopping area.

History 
The  fairgrounds were acquired by the City of Birmingham in 1947.

Alabama State Fair 
For many years, the grounds were home to the Alabama State Fair. State fairs in Alabama date back to the days of the Antebellum South.

The statue of Vulcan, was originally displayed at the fairgrounds, either whole or in pieces during its construction; it is now a Birmingham landmark atop Red Mountain. 

During the civil rights demonstrations of the 1960s, the fairgrounds were used by Police Commissioner Bull Connor to imprison arrested demonstrators when the city's jails were full. The fairgrounds have also been used by the Federal Emergency Management Agency for a disaster outreach event.

"Kiddieland," a small amusement park located at the Fairgrounds, was a popular attraction for many years but closed in the early 1990s. A "Mikado" steam locomotive, #4018, which once worked on the St. Louis-San Francisco Railway was displayed on the grounds from 1952 to 2009. It has since been relocated to Sloss Furnaces. Former fairgrounds manager Tom Drilias resigned in 1999 following a dispute over unpaid bills at another festival he ran, and was later the subject of an article in the Chicago Tribune reporting a series of legal problems. 

The state fair discontinued regular use of the facility because of poor attendance and high crime in the adjacent neighborhood. The Alabama State Fair Authority went bankrupt, and was dissolved sometime around the year 2001. No state fair has been held on a regular basis since; an effort to revive the state fair again in 2008 took place at the Verizon Wireless Music Center in nearby Pelham. The "Alabama National Fair", sometimes also called the "Alabama State Fair" in Montgomery is unrelated. 

In 2009, there was an Alabama State Fair.

Birmingham International Raceway 
The old grandstand for the Alabama State Fair was later used as the Birmingham International Raceway (or BIR), it was designed initially as a home to both automobile and harness racing, as well as shows and concerts. Birmingham International Raceway (BIR) was located inside the gates of the Fairgrounds; it was demolished in January 2009, to make room for the construction of a natatorium and indoor track and field facility.

References

External links
The Alabama State Fairgrounds by the City of Birmingham.
Google Maps Link

Buildings and structures in Birmingham, Alabama
Fairgrounds in the United States
Tourist attractions in Birmingham, Alabama